Swanberg Air was an airline based in Grande Prairie, Alberta, Canada. It operated cargo, scheduled and charter passenger services in Alberta, Saskatchewan and British Columbia. The airline ceased operations in 2011.

Destinations 

Destinations:

 Alberta
Calgary (Calgary International Airport - Departing from Swanberg hangar)
Edmonton (Shell Aero Centre)
Grande Prairie (Grande Prairie Airport - Departing from Swanberg hangar)
 British Columbia
Fort St. John (Fort St. John Airport)
Fort Nelson (Fort Nelson Airport)

See also 
 List of defunct airlines of Canada

References

External links 
Swanberg Air

Defunct airlines of Canada
Regional airlines of Saskatchewan
Regional airlines of Alberta
Regional airlines of British Columbia
Air Transport Association of Canada
Companies based in Alberta
Grande Prairie